Nyi Taw Temple is a temple in Mrauk U, Myanmar. It was built by Min Khayi, the second king of Mrauk-U Kingdom in AD 1433. It is situated next to Le-myet-hna Temple which was built by his brother Min Saw Mon, the founder of Mrauk-U Kingdom.

Image gallery

See also 
List of Temples in Mrauk U
Le-myet-hna Temple
Min Khayi

References

 

Mrauk-U Kingdom
Buddhist temples in Rakhine State
Religious buildings and structures completed in 1433
Establishments in Myanmar by century
15th-century establishments in Burma
15th-century Buddhist temples